Gav Piazi (also Romanized as Gāv Pīāzī; also known as Bardeyālī) is a village in Javid-e Mahuri Rural District, in the Central District of Mamasani County, Fars Province, Iran. At the 2006 census, its population was 656, in 149 families.

References 

Populated places in Mamasani County